Lahore Knowledge Park (LKP) is an under-construction science park located on a 852 acres located on Bedian Road in Lahore District, Pakistan.

Owned and managed by the Lahore Knowledge Park Company with an initial investment of $1 billion, of which $200 million is invested by Government of Punjab. The project is designed by Frost & Sullivan. The park include's universities, science and innovation hubs, a retail and central business district, a residential district, an entertainment zone and green areas.

Pakistan Kidney and Liver Institute and Research Center is under construction in the park.

Masterplan 
The park's masterplan divides it into five categories:
 life sciences and bio-technology, 
 design and creative industry, 
 information technology, 
 computer sciences 
 and science and engineering
As of 2016, the COMSATS Institute of Information Technology and Lancaster University will jointly set up a graduate school in the park. Information Technology University will also move its campus to the park.

References 

Science parks in Pakistan
Information technology in Pakistan
Science and technology in Punjab, Pakistan